Bellator 278: Velasquez vs. Carmouche was a mixed martial arts event produced by Bellator MMA that took place on April 22, 2022, at the Neal S. Blaisdell Arena in Honolulu, Hawaii, United States.

Background 
Bellator 278 was dedicated for military and first responders meaning that there will be no tickets on sale to the general public. The event was headlined a Bellator Women's Flyweight Title Bout between undefeated flyweight champ, Juliana Velasquez and challenger Liz Carmouche.

The event also featured two wild card qualifier bouts for the Bellator Bantamweight World Grand Prix due to injuries removing Bellator Bantamweight World Champion Sergio Pettis and James Gallagher from the tournament. Josh Hill was to face Enrique Barzola with the winner later meeting Magomed Magomedov in the opening round, while the winner of the second qualifier between Jornel Lugo and Danny Sabatello would face Leandro Higo in the first round of the tournament. Due to Covid, Hill had to pull out of the bout and was replaced by Nikita Mikhailov.

A bantamweight bout between Cee Jay Hamilton and Jared Scoggins was scheduled for this event. However, Scoggins pulled out of the bout for unknown reasons and was replaced by Érik Pérez. Pérez in turn pulled out of the bout and Hamilton was not rebooked, instead being paid his show money, despite not weighing in or fighting.

A lightweight bout between Tofiq Musayev and Zach Zane was scheduled for this event. However, the bout was scrapped after Zane pulled out due to unknown reasons and Tofiq wasn't rebooked against a new opponent.

Results

See also 

 2022 in Bellator MMA
 List of Bellator MMA events
 List of current Bellator fighters
 Bellator MMA Rankings

References 

Sports competitions in Honolulu
Bellator MMA events
2022 in mixed martial arts
April 2022 sports events in the United States
2022 in sports in Hawaii
Mixed martial arts in Hawaii
Sports competitions in Hawaii